is a Japanese scriptwriter, director, actor, voice actor, narrator, copywriter and designer. He was affiliated with Office Osawa and currently attached under DANDELION.

Biography

Filmography

Television animation
2003
Origami Warriors – Fuma Hanazuki
2006
Ouran High School Host Club – male student B (ep 24)
xxxHOLiC – Student B (ep 24)
Zegapain – Kyo Sogoru
Kirarin Revolution – Subaru Tsukishima
Mamotte! Lollipop – Will
Kujibiki Unbalance – Mugio Rokuhara

2007
Engage Planet Kiss Dum – Ueno (ep 9 and 10)
Kamichama Karin – Kirio Karasuma
Bokurano – Yosuke Kirie, Shinichi Kodaka (ep 4)
Mushi-Uta – Daisuke Kusuriya
Da Capo II – Yoshiyuki Sakurai
Shakugan no Shana Second – Chairman (ep 12)
Minami-ke – Sensei, Takeru-ojisan
Genshiken 2 – Neko Kazamatsuri (ep 1)
Ghost Hound – Michio Hoshino

2008
Minami-ke: Okawari – Takeru-ojisan
Yu-Gi-Oh! 5D's – Crow Hogan
Da Capo II Second Season – Yoshiyuki Sakurai
Shugo Chara! – Shuji Hinamori (ep 35)
Birdy the Mighty: Decode – Sudo Ryota
Legends of the Dark King: A Fist of the North Star Story – young Juza (ep 7)
Nodame Cantabile: Paris Arc – Frank
Negibozu no Asataro – Kyuubee

2009
Gintama – Parody Goku (ep 119)
Minami-ke: Okaeri – Takeru
Samurai Harem – Keita Torigaya
Birdy the Mighty Decode:02 – Ryota Sudo, Valic
Polyphonica Crimson S
Guin Saga – István
First Love Limited – Etsu Kusuda
Sweet Blue Flowers – Yasushi Kawanoi
Modern Magic Made Simple – Sōshirō Anehara
Nyan Koi! – Junpei Kōsaka

2010
Nodame Cantabile: Finale – Frank
The Betrayal Knows My Name – Masamune Shinmei
The Tatami Galaxy – Protagonist
Okami-san and Her Seven Companions – Tarō Urashima
Seitokai Yakuindomo – Takatoshi Tsuda
Mazinkaizer SKL – Ken Kaidō

2011
Dream Eater Merry – Chris Evergreen (ep 4-5)
Beelzebub – Kazuya Yamamura
Fractale – Sunda Granitz
Sket Dance – Seiji Igarashi (ep 16-17, 20)
Hoshizora e Kakaru Hashi – Hoshino Kazuma
Moshidora – Masayoshi Nikai
Phi Brain: Puzzle of God – Kaito Daimon
Haganai – Masaru Suzuki (ep 2)

2012
Place to Place – Sakaki Inui
Accel World – Takumu Mayuzumi (Taku)
Beyblade: Shogun Steel – Blader Guy
One Piece – Zeo
Phi Brain: Puzzle of God 2nd Season – Kaito Daimon
The Pet Girl of Sakurasou – Kazuki Fujisawa
Blast of Tempest – Takumi Hayakawa

2013
Cuticle Detective Inaba – Akiyoshi
Ace of Diamond – Kuramochi Youichi
Problem Children Are Coming from Another World, Aren't They? – Sakamaki Izayoi
Majestic Prince – Toshikazu Asagi
Minami-ke: Tadaima – Sensei, Takeru-ojisan
Psycho-Pass – Mitsuru Sasayama (ep 12)
Ro-Kyu-Bu! – Ryūichi Suga
Phi Brain: Puzzle of God 3rd Season – Kaito Daimon

2014
Seitokai Yakuindomo* – Takatoshi Tsuda
Hamatora – Nojima (ep 2)
Z/X Ignition – Rindo
No-Rin – Kosaku Hata
Wake Up, Girls! – Kōhei Matsuda
Daimidaler: Prince vs Penguin Empire – Dennis
Nobunaga Concerto – Maeda Toshiie
One Week Friends – Hajime Kujo
Tokyo Ghoul – Nishiki Nishio
Baby Steps – Hiromi Iwasa
Akame ga Kill! – Susanoo
Gundam Reconguista in G – Ringo Lon Giamanotta

2015
Ace of Diamond 2nd Season – Kuramochi Youichi
Assassination Classroom – Hiroto Maehara
Baby Steps Season 2 – Hiromi Iwasa
K: Return of Kings - Masaomi Dewa, Yujiro Benzai
Chivalry of a Failed Knight – Nagi Arisuin
Tokyo Ghoul √A – Nishiki Nishio
Yu-Gi-Oh! Arc-V – Crow Hogan

2016
Snow White with the Red Hair 2 – Itoya
Assassination Classroom 2nd Season – Hiroto Maehara
She and Her Cat: Everything Flows – Black Cat, I (narration)
Touken Ranbu: Hanamaru- Nakigitsune (6 episodes)
The Asterisk War 2nd Season – Verner (ep 4-5, 7-9)
Undefeated Bahamut Chronicle – Lagried False (ep 2, 11-12)

2017
My First Girlfriend Is a Gal - Junichi Hashiba, EroJunichi (ep 1-3, 5, 8)
Food Wars! Shokugeki no Souma: The Third Plate - Rentarou KusunokiScum's Wish – Atsuya Kirishima

2018Zoku Touken Ranbu: Hanamaru – Nakigitsune (ep. 2, 4-7, 10)Violet Evergarden – Aiden Field (ep. 11)Cutie Honey Universe – Seiji HayamiTsurune – Masaki Takigawa

2019Ace of Diamond Act II - Yōichi KuramochiCarole & Tuesday – Mermaid SistersEnsemble Stars! – Leo TsukinagaGiven – Ugetsu Murata

2020A3! Season Spring & Summer – Itaru ChigasakiWoodpecker Detective's Office – Takuboku IshikawaHypnosis Mic: Division Rap Battle: Rhyme Anima – Samatoki Aohitsugi

2022Tatami Time Machine Blues – ProtagonistShine On! Bakumatsu Bad Boys! – Katsura Kogorou

2023The Legendary Hero Is Dead! – Diego ValentineAo no Orchestra – Yō Hatori

TBAMigi to Dali – Shunpei AkiyamaMr. Villain's Day Off – Warumono-san

Original video animation (OVA)Shakugan no Shana S (2009) – Yukio Hamaguchi (ep 3-4)Birdy the Mighty Decode: The Cipher (2009) – Ryota SudoTokimeki Memorial 4 OVA (2009) – male student/game protagonistHoshizora e Kakaru Hashi (2011) – Hoshino KazumaSeitokai Yakuindomo (2011–present) – Takatoshi TsudaBlack Butler: Book of Murder (2014) – Arthur Conan DoyleCyborg 009 VS Devilman (2015) - Akira Fudo/Devilman

Theatrical animationThe Garden of Sinners: Remaining Sense of Pain – Keita MinatoKowarekake no Orgel (2010) – JunpeiYu-Gi-Oh!: Bonds Beyond Time (2010) – Crow HoganCyborg 009 Vs. Devilman (2015) – Devilman / Akira FudōSeitokai Yakuindomo: The Movie (2017) – Takatoshi TsudaFireworks (2017) – JunichiSeitokai Yakuindomo: The Movie 2 (2021) – Takatoshi TsudaTsurune the Movie: The First Shot (2022) – Masaki Takigawa

Live-Action Drama/MoviesUltraman Mebius (2006) - Jasyuline (Middle brother (Voice of Dai Matsumoto (Elder brother) und Haji (Youngest brother)) (ep 37)Ultra Zero Fight (2012) - Alien Bat GlacierDoubutsu Sentai Zyuohger (2016) - Sanbaba (ep 36)Ultraman Geed (2017) - Alien Shadow Zena (eps 1, 4 - 5, 9 - 12, 14 - 18, 20 - ,)Kikai Sentai Zenkaiger (2021-2022) - Juran/Zenkai Juran (ep 1 - 49)Saber + Zenkaiger: Super Hero Senki (2021) - Juran/Zenkai Juran Kikai Sentai Zenkaiger vs Kiramager vs Senpaiger (2022) - Juran/Zenkai Juran

Video gamesSuper Robot Wars UX – Ken KaidouXenoblade Chronicles – Shulk, ZanzaSuper Smash Bros. for Nintendo 3DS and Wii U – ShulkStreet Fighter V - AlexXenoblade Chronicles X – Custom Male AvatarZegapain XOR – Kyo SogoruOmega Quintet – TaktTokyo Xanadu – Kou TokisakaEnsemble Stars! – Leo TsukinagaSuper Smash Bros. Ultimate – ShulkTouken Ranbu- Nakigitsune & his foxA3! - Chigasaki ItaruAkane-sasu Sekai de Kimi to Utau - Kibi no MakibiDragalia Lost - Luca Mahotsukai no Yakusoku  - OwenHypnosis Mic: Division Rap Battle: Rhyme Anima – Samatoki Aohitsugi
Alchemy Stars - Regal
Alchemy Stars - Luke
Ikemen Prince - Gilbert Von Obsidian

DubbingAliens in the Attic – Tom Pearson (Carter Jenkins)All About Steve – Howard (DJ Qualls)The Banker – Matt Steiner (Nicholas Hoult)Cinderella – Prince Valiant (Gideon Turner)Clarice – Tomas Esquivel (Lucca De Oliveira)Constantine (2008 TV Asahi edition) – Chas Kramer (Shia LaBeouf)Dark Phoenix – Hank McCoy/Beast (Nicholas Hoult)The Darkest Hour – Sean (Emile Hirsch)Den Brother – Alex Pearson (Hutch Dano)Drake & Josh – Drake Parker (Drake Bell)Euphoria – Nate Jacobs (Jacob Elordi)Fright Night – Charley Brewster (Anton Yelchin)Glee – Sebastian Smythe (Grant Gustin)Milk – Cleve Jones (Emile Hirsch)Mortuary – Jonathan Doyle (Dan Byrd)Mutant World – Geoff King (Jason Cermak)Nick & Norah's Infinite Playlist – Nick Yidiaris (Michael Cera)The Other Side of Heaven – John H. Groberg (Christopher Gorham)Peter Rabbit – Thomas McGregor (Domhnall Gleeson)Peter Rabbit 2: The Runaway – Thomas McGregor (Domhnall Gleeson)Scream 4 – Robbie Mercer (Erik Knudsen)X-Men: Apocalypse – Hank McCoy/Beast (Nicholas Hoult)X-Men: Days of Future Past – Hank McCoy/Beast (Nicholas Hoult)X-Men: First Class – Hank McCoy/Beast (Nicholas Hoult)Youth – Jimmy Tree (Paul Dano)Zeke and Luther – Ezekiel "Zeke" Falcone (Hutch Dano)

Music

Singles
  (2012-04-18) (as Acchi⇔Kocchi'' with Rumi Ookubo, Nobuhiko Okamoto, Hitomi Nabatame & Kaori Fukuhara)
  (2012-08-21) with Hiroki Aiba & Junya Ikeda

Anime songs
Atchi Kotchi "Seishun Love la Boogie woogie!!" (青春ラブ･ラ･ブギウギ!!)
Gen x Pei Gakuen Kassenroku "Nen-Nen Sai-Sai Day By Day!" (ネンネンサイサイDay By Day!) (with Yūki Kaji)
Minami-ke "Down&Up! and Dowb↓"
Ōkami-san "Ai wa Katsu" (愛は勝つ)
Mondaiji-tachi ga Isekai Kara Kuru Sō Desu yo? "Unknown World"
Diamond no Ace "GO MY WAY"
Ensemble stars "Checkmate"
Ensemble stars "Voice of Sword"
Ensemble stars "Silent Oath"
Ensemble stars "Fight for Judge"
Ensemble stars "Article of Faith"
Ensemble stars "Knights the Phantom Thief"
Ensemble stars "Crush of Judgement"
Ensemble stars "Grateful allegiance"
Ensemble stars "Birthday of Music!"
Ensemble stars "Promise Swords"
Hypnosis Mic "G anthem of Y-CITY"
Hypnosis Mic "Yokohama Walker” (with Wataru Komada and Shinichiro Kamio)
Hypnosis Mic "WAR WAR WAR" (with Subaru Kimura, Haruki Ishiya, and Kōhei Amasaki)
Hypnosis Mic "DEATH RESPECT" (with Wataru Komada, Shinichiro Kamio, Show Hayami, Kijima Ryuichi, and Kento Ito)
Hypnosis Mic "Yokohama Walker (Triple Trippin' Remix)" (with Wataru Komada and Shinichiro Kamio)
Hypnosis Mic "T.D.D. LEGEND" (with Subaru Kimura, Show Hayami, and Yuusuke Shirai)
Hypnosis Mic "Hypnosis Mic -Division Rap Battle-" (ヒプノシスマイク -Division Rap Battle-) (with Subaru Kimura, Haruki Ishiya, Kōhei Amasaki, Wataru Komada,  Shinichiro Kamio, Show Hayami, Kijima Ryuichi, Kento Ito, Yuusuke Shirai, Soma Saito, Yukihiro Nozuyama)
Hypnosis Mic "Hypnosis Mic -Division Batte Anthem" (ヒプノシスマイク -Division Battle Anthem-)(with Subaru Kimura, Haruki Ishiya, Kōhei Amasaki, Wataru Komada,  Shinichiro Kamio, Show Hayami, Kijima Ryuichi, Kento Ito, Yuusuke Shirai, Soma Saito, Yukihiro Nozuyama)
Hypnosis Mic "Hoodstar" (with Subaru Kimura, Haruki Ishiya, Kōhei Amasaki, Wataru Komada,  Shinichiro Kamio, Show Hayami, Kijima Ryuichi, Kento Ito, Yuusuke Shirai, Soma Saito, Yukihiro Nozuyama)
Hypnosis Mic "Shinogi (Dead Pools)” (シノギ (Dead Pools)) (with Wataru Komada and Shinichiro Kamio)
Hypnosis Mic "RED ZONE(Don't test da Master)" (with Wataru Komada and Shinichiro Kamio)
Hypnosis Mic "Bayside Suicide” (with Wataru Komada and Shinichiro Kamio)
Hypnosis Mic "HUNTING CHARM” (with Wataru Komada and Shinichiro Kamio)
Hypnosis Mic "Reason To Fight” (with Wataru Komada, Shinichiro Kamio, Shirai Yusuke, Soma Saito and Yukihiro Nozuyama)
Hypnosis Mic "Double Trouble" (with Ryota Iwasaki)
 A3! "Home" (with Sakai Koudai, Shirai Yusuke, Kotaro Nishiyama, Masashi Igarashi)
Ensemble stars "Little Romance"
Ensemble stars "Mystic Fragrance"
Ensemble stars "Castle of my Heart"

References

External links
 Official blog 
 Official Agency Profile 
 Shintarō Asanuma at GamePlaza-Haruka Voice Acting Database 
 Shintarō Asanuma at Hitoshi Doi's Seiyuu Database
 

1976 births
Living people
Male voice actors from Iwate Prefecture
People from Morioka, Iwate
Japanese copywriters
Japanese dramatists and playwrights
Japanese screenwriters
Japanese theatre directors
Japanese male video game actors
Japanese male voice actors
Writers from Iwate Prefecture
Tama Art University alumni
20th-century Japanese male actors
21st-century Japanese male actors